Fábio Rogério Correa Lopes (born 1985) is a Brazilian association footballer for Maranhão. He plays as a striker.

Career
Fabio Lopes made his debut for Cerezo Osaka on the 2nd Osaka Derby of the 2011 J. League Division 1 season, which ended in a 1-1 draw.

References

External links
 

 
 Fábio Lopes at ZeroZero

1985 births
Living people
Brazilian footballers
Brazilian expatriate footballers
Expatriate footballers in South Korea
Expatriate footballers in Japan
J1 League players
Cerezo Osaka players
Daejeon Hana Citizen FC players
K League 1 players
Cruzeiro Esporte Clube players
Sampaio Corrêa Futebol Clube players
Expatriate footballers in Thailand
Association football forwards
People from São Luís, Maranhão
Sportspeople from Maranhão